Vila Pavão is a municipality located in the Brazilian state of Espírito Santo. Its population was 9,244 (2020) and its area is 433 km². East Pomeranian, a dialect of Low German, has co-official status in Vila Pavão.

References

Municipalities in Espírito Santo